Werner Rackwitz (3 December 1929 – 14 March 2014) was a German opera director and politician. From 1963 to 1969, he was the Head of Music at the Ministry of Culture of the German Democratic Republic (East Germany) and from 1969 to 1981 he was the Deputy Minister of Culture. He was born in Breslau, Weimar Republic (now Wrocław, Poland).

Rackwitz died after a short illness on 14 March 2014 in Berlin, Germany; he was 84 years old.

References

External links
 "Werner Rackwitz", German National Library 

1929 births
2014 deaths
Politicians from Berlin
Opera managers
People from East Berlin
Politicians from Wrocław